Commonly known as U.S.Nautical magazine, the U.S. Nautical magazine and Naval Journal was a monthly nautical newsletter published by Griffiths & Bates (New York City) in the 19th century.

History
The U.S.nautical Magazine was first published as the Monthly Nautical Magazine and Quarterly review by Griffiths & Bates (a publishing house in New York). Volume 1 of the U.S. Nautical magazine covered the period October 1854 to March 1855.

Contents
The U.S.Nautical magazine carried articles on seamanship, naval architecture, lists of ship builders in America, descriptions of ships / clippers constructed (like the Sunny South, and Blue Jacket) and their voyages, and often, discoveries of islands and reefs made by ships. It also contained articles on disasters at sea, collisions and financial articles related to shipping.

Further reading
Monthly Nautical Magazine and Quarterly Review, Volume 1
Monthly Nautical Magazine and Quarterly Review, Volume 2
Monthly Nautical Magazine and Quarterly Review, Volume 5
Monthly Nautical Magazine and Quarterly Review, Volume 6-7

References

Monthly magazines published in the United States
Defunct magazines published in the United States
Magazines established in 1854
Magazines disestablished in 1855
Magazines published in New York City
Maritime magazines
Newsletters
1854 establishments in New York (state)